Emilie Burrer Foster (born 1947) is an American former professional tennis player.

Born in 1947, Burrer is a native Texan and played collegiate tennis for Trinity University, where she won a team record four intercollegiate championships. She won consecutive singles and doubles titles in 1968 and 1969.

Burrer, a Junior Wightman Cup player, represented the United States at the 1967 Pan American Games.

During the 1960s she featured in several editions of the US Open and was a two-time doubles quarter-finalist. In 1969 she made the round of 16 of the singles, beating Carole Caldwell Graebner en route.

Burrer is a member of the ITA Women's Collegiate Tennis Hall of Fame.

References

External links
 

1947 births
Living people
American female tennis players
Tennis people from Texas
Trinity Tigers women's tennis players
Tennis players at the 1967 Pan American Games
Pan American Games competitors for the United States